Established Titles is a company which sells souvenir plots of Scottish land from 1 sq ft (0.09 m2) to 20 sq ft (1.86 m2). While the company claims that those who buy the plots can choose to be titled Lord, Laird or Lady, as part of a supposed "traditional Scottish custom", souvenir plots are too small to be legally registered for ownership and owners of souvenir plots do not have the right to officially title themselves. The company also keeps legal ownership. It owns land in Ardallie, Aberdeenshire, Dunfermline, Dumfries, Galloway and the Borders. It was founded by CEO Katerina Yip.

Established Titles is a prolific sponsor of YouTubers. The company is owned by Hong Kong-based investment firm Galton Voysey Ltd.  

Established Titles has allegedly been referred to the Advertising Standards Authority.

Controversy
On 23 November 2022, YouTuber Scott Shafer uploaded a video accusing Established Titles of being a scam which misleads its customers, advising YouTubers to stop working with the company as they do not legally bestow ownership. After the video went viral, many YouTubers dropped their sponsorships, including Philip DeFranco and SomeOrdinaryGamers. Established Titles defended itself in a letter to its partners saying that it was "under a targeted, completely unfounded attack based on bogus claims", claiming that it had been transparent about its practices. Many other YouTubers have released videos reasserting Shafer's stance. Established Titles has also defended themselves by describing plots as "a fun gift, meant for a good laugh" and that customers are aware of this; this has been refuted by customers who NBC has reported actually believed they were buying land.

References

External links 

 Official website
 Scott Shafer's YouTube video

Internet properties established in 2019
Novelty items